Matthew Ian Gravelle (born 24 September 1976) is a Welsh screen actor.

Career
Gravelle was born in Porthcawl. In 2003, Gravelle appeared in the BBC One drama series Holby City and was a regular in the acclaimed BBC Wales show Belonging for two series. His other TV appearances include Casualty, Caerdydd and Judge John Deed. He appeared in "End of Days", the first series finale of Torchwood, as a medical doctor dealing with cases of the Black Death. He later provided voice acting for the Torchwood Radio Play "The Dead Line" which broadcast on BBC Radio Four in July 2009.

From 2007, he played the lead character of gangster Lyn Edwards in the Welsh-language television series Y Pris, dubbed "'The Sopranos' by the sea". The role earned him a BAFTA Cymru nomination for best actor in 2010.

Gravelle starred in the 2010 film Patagonia and then in the BBC Wales series Baker Boys as Rob, the co-manager of Valley Bara and the fiancée of Sarah (Eve Myles). In 2013, he was cast in the hit ITV crime drama Broadchurch as Joe Miller, husband of Olivia Colman's character. Later that year he guest-starred in the Welsh detective drama Y Gwyll, in which his real-life wife Mali Harries stars. He also starred with Harries in Keeping Faith/Un Bore Mercher (2017), where they played a married couple.

Personal life
Gravelle is married to fellow Welsh performer Mali Harries.  The couple have played each other's on-screen significant other in several TV shows.

In 2009, The Western Mail listed him as the 24th sexiest man in Wales.

Filmography

Film

Television

Radio

Video games

References

External links 
 
 CV on Curtis Brown

1976 births
Living people
People from Porthcawl
Welsh male film actors
Welsh male radio actors
Welsh male television actors
Welsh male video game actors
Welsh-speaking actors